Mordellistena exilis is a beetle in the genus Mordellistena of the family Mordellidae. It was described in 1917 by Liljeblad.

References

exilis
Beetles described in 1917